Mallesham is a 2019 Indian Telugu-language biographical film based on the life of Chintakindi Mallesham, written and directed by RajR. The film features Priyadarshi as Mallesham, alongside Jhansi, debutante Ananya Nagalla and Ananda Chakrapani in prominent roles. The film garnered positive reviews from critics upon release. Priyadarshi's performance in the film is regarded as one of the "100 Greatest Performances of the Decade" by Film Companion.

Plot 

Chintakindi Mallesham, a school dropout, goes on to revolutionize the weaving industry by creating the Asu machine.

Cast 
Priyadarshi as Chintakindi Mallesham
Jhansi as Lakshmi
Ananya Nagalla as Padma
Ananda Chakrapani as Narasimhulu
Gangavva as the ceiling fan home owner
Jagadeesh Prathap Bandhari as Anji 
Durgaprasad K as Electrician Kiran 
Anvesh Michael as Raju
Jayasri Rachakonda as Dr. Indira, gynecologist
Thiruveer as Veera Pratap
Laxman Aelay as Padma's father
Thagubothu Ramesh as a drunkard
Dheer Charan Srivastav as Abdul

Production 
Short film director Raj made his directorial debut with this film. He had seen the TED talk by Chintakindi Mallesham and wanted to create a film about Mallesham. Carl Zeiss super-speed lenses were used to shoot the film as Raj wanted the film to feel like Shyam Benegal's Susman (1987). The film was shot in Revanapally and the crew stayed in the village for a year to shoot the film. Laxman Aelay was signed as the head of art production after a hiatus of almost 25 years. His last work was Nirantharam (1995). He helped the crew by referring local artisans to the team. His drawings of weavers were used as references for the crew.  The trailer released on 29 May.

Soundtrack 

The songs were composed by Mark K Robin.

Release 
The Times of India gave the film four out of five stars and stated that "The film delivers what it promises – the story of a common man who dared to find a practical solution to the issue at hand, a man anyone can relate to. Director Raj Rachakonda needs to be lauded for this". The New Indian Express stated that "And yes, Raj deserves applause for churning out a film which has its heart in the right place. Priyadarshi’s complete ownership of the role is what elevates this film a few notches higher." The Hindu wrote that "This indie-spirited film is a heart-warming portrayal of tenacity and triumph".

Digital release 
The film has a theatrical release and digitally released on Netflix.

Accolades

References

External links 

2010s Telugu-language films
Indian biographical films
2019 films
Films set in Telangana
Films shot in Telangana